In statistics, the Chapman–Robbins bound or Hammersley–Chapman–Robbins bound is a lower bound on the variance of estimators of a deterministic parameter. It is a generalization of the Cramér–Rao bound; compared to the Cramér–Rao bound, it is both tighter and applicable to a wider range of problems. However, it is usually more difficult to compute.

The bound was independently discovered by John Hammersley in 1950, and by Douglas Chapman and Herbert Robbins in 1951.

Statement 
Let  be the set of parameters for a family of probability distributions . 

Then

A generalization to the multivariable case is

Proof 
By the variational representation of chi-squared divergence,

For the multivariate case, we define  for any .

Relation to Cramér–Rao bound 
The expression inside the supremum in the Chapman–Robbins bound converges to the Cramér–Rao bound when , assuming the regularity conditions of the Cramér–Rao bound hold. This implies that, when both bounds exist, the Chapman–Robbins version is always at least as tight as the Cramér–Rao bound; in many cases, it is substantially tighter. 

The Chapman–Robbins bound also holds under much weaker regularity conditions. For example, no assumption is made regarding differentiability of the probability density function p(x; θ). When p(x; θ) is non-differentiable, the Fisher information is not defined, and hence the Cramér–Rao bound does not exist.

See also 
 Cramér–Rao bound
 Estimation theory

References

Further reading 
 

Statistical inequalities
Estimation theory